Lucius Calpurnius Piso was a Roman statesman of the 1st century. He was the grandson and son of men who had made huge fortunes from selling armaments which were used by the Roman legions. Piso was a close relative of Julius Caesar. His mother and Caesar's mother, Aurelia Cotta, were Rutilias of the same family. Piso's 
father was also named Lucius Piso. The father is noted for creating a law dealing with extortion and embezzlement.

Piso was a tall, swarthy man with huge bristling black eyebrows. He served as an urban praetor. When he was serving as a praetor in Spain Piso was killed while practicing his exercises in arms.
He was murdered by a peasant who refused to disclose his accomplices, even though he was tortured on a rack.

References

Ancient Roman murder victims
1st-century Romans